This is a list of notable events in Latin music (music from Spanish- and Portuguese-speaking areas from Latin America, Europe, and the United States) that took place in 1994.

Events 
 March 1 – The 36th Annual Grammy Awards are held at the Radio City Music Hall in New York City.
 Luis Miguel wins the Grammy Award for Best Latin Pop Album for his album Aries.
 Gloria Estefan wins the Grammy Award for Best Tropical Latin Album for her album Mi Tierra
 Selena wins the Grammy Award for Best Mexican-American Album for her album Live!.
 March 10BMI launches its own Latin music award to honor the best performing Latin songs of the year published by the company. "Otro Día Más Sin Verte" by Jon Secada is awarded Latin song of the year while Álvaro Torres is honored Latin songwriter of the year.
 May 16 - May 19 – The fifth annual Billboard Latin Music Conference is held at the InterContinental Hotel in Florida with the conference focusing on Brazilian music and Latin jazz for the first time.
 The inaugural Billboard Latin Music Awards also takes place with Cuban-American singer Gloria Estefan being the biggest winners with three awards. Cuban singer Celia Cruz and Cuban musician Cachao are inducted into the Billboard Latin Music Hall of Fame.
 May 19 – The 6th Annual Lo Nuestro Awards are held at the James L. Knight Center in Miami, Florida. Cuban-American singer Gloria Estefan and American Tejano group La Mafia are the biggest winners of the ceremony with both receiving three awards.
 June 4  – National Academy of Recording Arts & Sciences approves a new category for Latin jazz album. The new award category is scheduled to debut on the following Grammy Award ceremony the next year. Despite being its appearance on the jazz field, Latin music committees are eligible to cast their vote on the award. 
 June 18 – Selena became the first non-crossover act to have an album (Amor Prohibido; released March 1994) to enter the Billboard 200 since Luis Miguel's Aries (1993). The album was credited with popularizing Tejano music and catapulting the genre into an "unprecedented level of mainstream success"; eventually becoming the best-selling Tejano record of all-time. It holds the record for most weeks in the top ten of the Top Latin Albums chart—at 110 weeks—while the record holds the record for most weeks at number one on the Regional Mexican Albums chart at 96 weeks.
 November 12 – Billboard updates the methodology for the Hot Latin Tracks chart to incorporate the Nielsen Broadcast Data Systems (BDS). Billboard also launches three sub-charts of the Hot Latin Tracks chart: Latin Pop Airplay, Regional Mexican Airplay, and Latin Tropical Airplay.

Bands formed 
 Laura Pausini (Latin pop)
 Kairo (Latin pop)
 Mónica Naranjo
 Ana Bárbara
 Ezequiel Peña
 Giro
 Carlos Nuño

Bands reformed

Bands disbanded

Bands on hiatus

Number-ones albums and singles by country 
 List of number-one albums of 1994 (Spain)
 List of number-one singles of 1994 (Spain)
 List of number-one Billboard Top Latin Albums of 1994
 List of number-one Billboard Hot Latin Tracks of 1994

Awards 
 1994 Premio Lo Nuestro
 1994 Billboard Latin Music Awards
 1994 Tejano Music Awards

Albums released

First quarter

January

February

March

Second quarter

April

May

June

Third quarter

July

August

September

Fourth quarter

October

November

December

Unknown

Best-selling records

Best-selling albums 
The following is a list of the top 10 best-selling Latin albums in the United States in 1994, according to Billboard.

Best-performing songs 
The following is a list of the top 10 best-performing Latin songs in the United States in 1994, according to Billboard.

Births 
January 15Myke Towers, Puerto Rican rapper
January 28 – Maluma, Colombian reggaeton singer
March 10Bad Bunny, Puerto Rican reggaeton and trap rapper
March 16Camilo, Colombian pop singer
April 25Jay Wheeler, Puerto Rican reggaeton singer
October 15Sebastián Yatra, Colombian pop singer

Deaths 
 February 8 – Amparo Ochoa, Mexican singer-songwriter
 July 17 – , Argentine tango composer
 November 21 – Santiago Chalar, Uruguayan physician traumatologist, poet, songwriter, musician, guitarist and singer
 December 8 – Antônio Carlos Jobim, Brazilian bossa nova composer

References

Notes 
 
 

 
Latin music by year